John Bagford  (1650/51, Fetter Lane, London – 5 May 1716, Islington) was an English antiquarian, writer, bibliographer, ballad-collector, bookseller, and biblioclast.

Life
Originally a shoemaker by trade, his premises were in the Great Turnstile.  That business was not successful so he became active in the book-trading market in Holborn from 1680, travelling to Haarlem, Leiden, and Amsterdam on this business and aiding such collectors as John Moore, Robert and Edward Harley, Sir Hans Sloane, Samuel Pepys and John Woodward.  Becoming friends with fellow antiquarians such as Thomas Hearne, Humfrey Wanley and Thomas Baker, he published antiquarian tracts, contributed to others, and edited an edition of Geoffrey Chaucer published by John Urry.

Bagford, together with Humfrey Wanley and John Talman, was one of three ‘founder members of the reconstituted ‘Society of Antiquaries’, which first met at the Bear Tavern on the Strand on 5 December 1707.

Bagford's collection contained many fragments of books such as title-pages and this gave him a reputation as a biblioclast for which he was excoriated in William Blades' The Enemies of Books. Likewise, a twentieth-century commentator has said how Bagford is mostly remembered today for "his ability to mangle any book he laid his hands on."

The Gray's Inn elephant tooth and stone tool

In 1715 Bagford wrote about the Gray's Inn Lane hand axe and the elephant tooth which had been found together by John Conyers opposite "Black Mary's".  He asserted that the elephant was probably introduced by Claudius but that the tool had been made by human workmanship.  He described this as a "British weapon" and as such he was one of the first to suggest that stone age tools were human-made, rather than produced by other causes (such as lightning).

See also
Bagford Ballads

References

External links

John Bagford in the Dictionary of National Biography (requires subscription)
Portraits of Bagford at the National Portrait Gallery, London
Article on Bagford (giving an erroneous birth year)
Milton McC. Gatch, ‘John Bagford, Bookseller and Antiquary’, British Library Journal 12 (1986), pp. 150–171 https://www.bl.uk/eblj/1986articles/pdf/article12.pdf

1650 births
1716 deaths
Antiquarians from London
British bibliographers
English booksellers
English book and manuscript collectors
English song collectors
Collectors from London